Otsheria is an extinct genus of anomodont, in the infraorder venyukovioidea. It lived in modern-day Russia during the Permian. 

The genus is named for the Ochyor region where it was discovered in 1960, and the type species is Otsheria netzvetajevi.

The holotype, a skull lacking a mandible (PIN 1758/5), is the only Otsheria fossil extant. The skull suggests four incisors and nine short, flattened maxillary teeth. The canines are undifferentiated. The shape of the teeth and skull both suggest a mouth adapted for cutting plant parts, which in turn suggests a herbivorous or omnivorous diet.

See also 
 List of therapsids

References

Further reading 
The Origin and Evolution of Mammals (Oxford Biology) by T. S. Kemp
The Age of Dinosaurs in Russia and Mongolia by Michael J. Benton, Mikhail A. Shishkin, David M. Unwin, and Evgenii N. Kurochkin
Origins of the Higher Groups of Tetrapods: Controversy and Consensus by Hans-Peter Schultze and Linda Trueb
Reptiles and Herbivory by G.M. King

Anomodont genera
Guadalupian synapsids
Guadalupian genus first appearances
Guadalupian genus extinctions
Prehistoric synapsids of Europe
Permian Russia
Fossils of Russia
Fossil taxa described in 1960